Bryan Paraon Gahol (July 30, 1977 – March 31, 2014) was a former Filipino professional basketball player in the Philippine Basketball Association.

Professional career

Gahol was a highly scouted prospect from the time he suited up for the Philippine Youth team and the injuries that hit him early in his career notwithstanding was expected to do well when he was drafted fourth overall by  Mobiline in 1999. The former University of the Philippines standout, though, hardly made an impact with the Phone Pals, who soon sent him packing in a three-team, four player transaction that also involved Shell and Tanduay. He initially landed at Shell, which later traded him to Alaska for Brixter Encarnacion. After Alaska, he also suited up for San Miguel and Red Bull Barako before retiring in 2006.

Death

Gahol was killed along with companion Rosemarie Manalo in a multiple-vehicle collision along the Skyway in the evening of March 31, 2014. He was driving a Nissan Urvan Escapade on the northbound lane of the SLEX near the Alabang exit at 10pm Monday night, along with four other friends, when their vehicle was hit by a delivery jeep filled with vegetables. Gahol and Manalo were declared dead on arrival at the hospital.

His remains were laid to rest at Makiling Memorial Garden in Los Baños, Laguna.

References

1977 births
2014 deaths
Alaska Aces (PBA) players
Barako Bull Energy Boosters players
Basketball players from Laguna (province)
Centers (basketball)
Filipino men's basketball players
People from Los Baños, Laguna
Power forwards (basketball)
Road incident deaths in the Philippines
San Miguel Beermen players
TNT Tropang Giga draft picks
TNT Tropang Giga players
UP Fighting Maroons basketball players